Phiri is a surname. Notable people with the surname include:
 Alfred Phiri (born 1974), South African footballer
 Bobang Phiri (born 1968), South African sprinter
 Catherine Phiri
 David Phiri (1937–2012), Zambian businessman, former Governor of the Central Bank of Zambia and Chairman of the Football Association of Zambia
 Davies Phiri (born 1976), Zambian football goalkeeper
 Desmond Dudwa Phiri, Malawian Author, Economist, Historian, and Playwright
 Dube Phiri (born 1983), Zambian footballer
 Edwin Phiri (born 1983), Zambian footballer
 Esther Phiri
 Gerald Phiri (born 1988), Zambian sprinter
 Gerald Phiri Jr. (born 1993), Malawian footballer
 James Phiri (1969– 2001), Zambian footballer
 Kinnah Phiri (born 1954), Malawian footballer and coach
 Lire Phiri, Lesothan footballer
 Patrick Phiri (born 1956), Zambian footballer and coach
 Ray Phiri (1947–2017), South African jazz, fusion and mbaqanga musician
 Willie Phiri (1953–2011), Zambian football midfielder and manager
Zambian surnames

Zimbabwean surnames
Surnames of Botswana